Anna Maria Siarkowska née Jabłońska (born 23 March 1982 in Warsaw) – is a Polish politician, member of the VIII and IX Sejm. One of the founders of the Republican Party, and later, its leader.

References 

1982 births
Living people
Politicians from Warsaw